The Belen City Hall, at 503 Becker Ave. in Belen, New Mexico, was listed on the National Register of Historic Places in 2019.

It is also known as Old Belen City Hall.

It was built in 1937 by the Works Progress Administration, using local labor and adobe, and is Pueblo Revival in style.

References

External links

City halls in New Mexico
National Register of Historic Places in Valencia County, New Mexico
Pueblo Revival architecture in New Mexico
Government buildings completed in 1937